The 1996 CECAFA Cup was the 22nd edition of the tournament. It was held in Sudan, and was won by Uganda. The matches were played between November 17–29.

Sudan sent two teams: Sudan A and Sudan B.

Group stage

Group A

Group B

Knockout stage

Semi-finals

Uganda Champion 1996 CECAFA Cup

Third place match

Final

References
RSSSF archives

CECAFA Cup